The ATP Challenger Tour in 2021 was the secondary professional tennis circuit organized by the ATP. The 2021 ATP Challenger Tour calendar comprised 147 tournaments with prize money ranging from $36,680 up to $156,240. It was the 44th edition of challenger tournaments cycle, and 13th under the name of Challenger Tour.

Tallon Griekspoor set a new record for winning the most Challenger titles in a season when he won his seventh title of the season at the Tenerife Challenger and immediately improved upon the record by winning the Slovak Open II the week after.

Schedule 
This is the complete schedule of events on the 2021 calendar, with player progression documented from the quarterfinals stage.

January

February

March

April

May

June

July

August

September

October

November

December

Cancelled tournaments
The following tournaments were formally announced by the ATP before being subsequently cancelled due to the COVID-19 pandemic.

Statistical information 
These tables present the number of singles (S) and doubles (D) titles won by each player and each nation during the season. The players/nations are sorted by: 1) total number of titles (a doubles title won by two players representing the same nation counts as only one win for the nation); 2) a singles > doubles hierarchy; 3) alphabetical order (by family names for players).

To avoid confusion and double counting, these tables should be updated only after an event is completed.

Titles won by player

Titles won by nation

Point distribution 
Points are awarded as follows:

References

External links 
 Official website
 Calendar

2021 in tennis
 
2021 ATP Challenger Tour